The  Aroid or Ari-Banna (formerly South Omotic or Somotic) languages possibly belong to the Afro-Asiatic family and are spoken in Ethiopia.

Languages
There are five Aroid languages:

 Aari-Gayil languages
 Aari
 Gayil
 Hamer-Karo languages
 Hamer-Banna
 Karo (Ethiopia)
 Dime

External classification
The classification of South Omotic (also called Aroid) is highly disputed and it may be a separate language family. Karo is sometimes considered as a dialect of Hamer, but considered as a separate language by Glottolog which groups both in a Hamer-Karo subfamily.

Zaborski (1986) and Lamberti (1993) consider South Omotic to be a separate branch of Cushitic, renaming it as West Cushitic.

Bender (2000, 2003) notes that South Omotic is in fact quite divergent from other Afroasiatic languages, and suggests that it may in fact have connections with Nilo-Saharan, such as Surmic and Nilotic.

Citing lexical similarities with Surmic and other non-Nilotic Nilo-Saharan languages, Yigezu (2013) argues that Aroid ( South Omotic) has a "Nilo-Saharan origin" and had become strongly influenced by other "Omotic" language groups. The Proto-Aroid vowel system is also more similar to those of the Surmic and Nilotic languages (Yigezu 2006, 2013).

Glottolog 4.0 does not recognize that South Omotic belongs to one of the disputed families, and the candidate group of Omotic languages (grouping both North and South Omotic languages) remains disputed. For this reason it is considered for now as a separate family.

Reconstruction

Below is a reconstruction of Proto-Aroid by Yigezu (2013).

Numerals
Comparison of numerals in individual languages:

See also
List of Proto-Aroid reconstructions (Wiktionary)

References 

 
Language families
Languages of Ethiopia
Omotic languages